Stadionul Metaloglobus is a multi-use stadium in Bucharest, Romania. It is used mostly for football matches and is the home ground of Metaloglobus București. The stadium holds 1,000 people.

References

Football venues in Romania
Buildings and structures in Bucharest
Sport in Bucharest